Ulrich "Uli" Strohschneider (12 May 1940 in Salzburg – 20 September 1998 in St. Gilgen) was a sailor from Austria. Strohschneider represented his country at the 1972 Summer Olympics in Kiel. Strohschneider took 17th place in the Soling with Peter Denzel and Robert Haschka as fellow crew members.

International Soling Association
Strohschneider served many terms within the ISA. During that period he succeeded to change the class rules to make the Soling unsinkable.

Professional life
Strohschneider was a pharmacologist in the Austrian federal government.

References

1940 births
1998 deaths
Sportspeople from Salzburg
Austrian male sailors (sport)
Sailors at the 1972 Summer Olympics – Soling
Olympic sailors of Austria
Neurological disease deaths in Austria
Deaths from motor neuron disease